Pan American C.M.A. Church (Christ Church) is a historic church at 76 Prospect Street in Newark, Essex County, New Jersey, United States.

It was built in 1848 and added to the National Register of Historic Places in 1972.

See also 
 National Register of Historic Places listings in Essex County, New Jersey

References

Churches in Newark, New Jersey
Churches on the National Register of Historic Places in New Jersey
Gothic Revival church buildings in New Jersey
Churches completed in 1848
19th-century churches in the United States
National Register of Historic Places in Newark, New Jersey
New Jersey Register of Historic Places